Xujing is a town in Qingpu District, Shanghai, China.

Transportation
Xujing has access to Line 17 and Line 2 of the Shanghai Metro system. The G15 Shenyang–Haikou Expressway, G50 Shanghai–Chongqing Expressway, and China National Highway 318 pass through the town.

Administrative divisions
As of 2022, Xujing administers the following 5 residents' committees, 23 residential communities, and 9 villages:

 Xujing Residents' Committee
 Longyang Residents' Committee
 Zhaidong Residents' Committee
 Jinghua Residents' Committee
 Panlong Residents' Committee
 Xu'an First Residential Community
 Xu'an Second Residential Community
 Gaojing Residential Community
 Weijiajiao First Residential Community
 Weijiajiao Second Residential Community
 Xu'an Third Residential Community
 Xu'an Fourth Residential Community
 Yulanqingfan Residential Community
 Shangming Road Residential Community
 Shangtai Road Residential Community
 Shangmao Road Residential Community
 Renhengxijiao Residential Community
 Weijiajiao Third Residential Community
 Mingzhu Road Residential Community
 Xiadu Residential Community
 Yelian Road Residential Community
 Panlongxinfan Residential Community
 Panwen Road Residential Community
 Xuying Road Residential Community
 Zhuguang Road Residential Community
 Leguo Road Residential Community
 Letian Residential Community
 Xule Road Residential Community
 Qianming Village
 Jinyun Village
 Lianmin Village
 Guanglian Village
 Minzhu Village
 Erlian Village
 Jinlian Village
 Zean Village
 Lujiajiao Village

References 

Towns in Shanghai
Divisions of Qingpu District